Richard Assheton Dermot Dinan is a British businessman, author, lecturer, and former television personality. He is the founder of aerospace company Pulsar Fusion, has written the book The Fusion Age: Modern Nuclear Fusion Reactors, and starred in the reality television series Made in Chelsea.

Early life 
Dinan is the son of Barry and Lady Charlotte-Anne Curzon and the grandson of Edward Curzon, 6th Earl Howe. He initially attended St. Edward’s School in Oxford. Dinan dropped out of school when he was 16 and began working at the London-based gunmaker and clothing retailer  Holland & Holland.

Career 
Shortly after working at Holland & Holland, Dinan founded the magazine Ammunition at age 16.
Dinan founded Applied Fusion Systems with physicist James Lambert in 2011 to develop nuclear reactors. The company’s first project was a spherical tokamak based on the Mega Ampere Spherical Tokamak.

Dinan debuted as a cast member on the reality television program Made in Chelsea on its third series, which aired in 2012. He returned to the show in its fifth series, which aired in 2013. He returned for a third time on the program’s tenth series, which aired in 2015.

Dinan also founded the 3D printing business Ion Core in 2013.

Dinan published the book The Fusion Age: Modern Nuclear Fusion Reactors in 2017 and was subsequently invited to lecture on nuclear fusion in venues such as Oxford University.

Dinan eventually changed Applied Fusion Systems’ company name to Pulsar Fusion. In 2019, Dinan and Lambert built a fusion reactor in Milton Keynes for Pulsar Fusion. Dinan and Lambert also began developing nuclear fusion-powered rocket thrusters for space flights and hybrid rocket engines at Pulsar Fusion.

Filmography

Television

Bibliography 

 Dinan, R. (2017). The fusion age: Modern nuclear fusion reactors. Milton Keynes, UK: Applied Fusion Systems.

References 

Living people
1986 births
Participants in British reality television series
20th-century English businesspeople
21st-century English businesspeople